Henry Kenny was an Irish politician.

Henry Kenny may also refer to:

Henry Edward Kenny (1888–1979), British soldier, Victoria Cross recipient
Henry Kenny (Australian politician) (1853–1899), Australian member of parliament

See also
Harry Kenny, Irish footballer